Ju Jingyi is a Chinese singer, dancer, and actress. She rose to fame as a member of Chinese idol girl group SNH48.

As a member of SNH48, during the annual General Elections, she was elected as No.4 (2014), No.2 (2015), No.1 (2016), and No.1 (2017) among over 100 members. As an actress, she is known for her role in the historical romance drama Legend of Yunxi (2018) and the fantasy romance drama The Legend of White Snake (2019).

Early life
Ju Jingyi was born in Suining, Sichuan. She studied at The Attached Middle School of Sichuan Conservatory of Music, majoring in violin, but dropped out to audition for SNH48.

Career

2014–2017: SNH48 and acting debut
On 18 August 2013, Ju Jingyi took part in the audition for second-generation members of SNH48, and was one of the 34 girls who qualified, becoming one of the 31 official second-generation members on 5 September. She made her first public appearance on 21 September, and had started performing weekly at the SNH48 Dream Stage. In November, she became a member of Team NII of SNH48. She participated in SNH48's first major concert, "SNH48 Guangzhou Concert", held in the Guangzhou International Sports Arena on 16 November.

In May 2014, Ju starred in her first music video, "Football Party". She subsequently ranked fourth during SNH48's first "General Election", during which they released their first album, Mae Shika Mukanee.

Ju was ranked second in SNH48's second "General Election", held on 25 July 2015. She became a member of sub-unit Seine River along with Zhao Jiamin and Li Yitong. Their first single "Sweet & Bitter" (苦与甜) was released on 31 October 2015.

In 2016, Ju made her acting debut in the fantasy drama Novoland: The Castle in the Sky, which started airing in July. She also released a soundtrack for the drama, titled "Xue Fei Shuang". On 30 July, during SNH48's third General Election, Ju was ranked first place with over 230,000 votes, the highest ever number of votes received by an SNH48 member. On 17 October, Ju released her first solo single "Everyday". On 10 December, she won the New Television Actress of the Year Award at the Tencent Video Star Awards for her performance in Novoland: The Castle in the Sky.

On 7 January 2017, she participated in SNH48's third Request Time, of which her song "Don't Touch", performed with Zeng Yanfen and Zhao Yue, came in first, giving her the opportunity to release her second solo single. On 15 February, she took on her first leading role in the detective web drama, Detective Samoyeds. The series was a success and broke 10 billion views at the end of its two seasons.
In May, Ju was announced to be one of the recipients of the "May 4th Medal", awarded by the Chinese Communist Youth League (CCYL) to outstanding youths who have made remarkable achievements in agriculture, hi-tech research, news coverage, politics and law, army and police. The same month, Ju released her second EP, Yes Or No. During SNH48's fourth General Election held on 29 July, Ju came in first with 277781.3 votes, becoming the first SNH48 member to hold the position as the senbatsu center for a consecutive year. In August, she featured in the fantasy drama Xuan-Yuan Sword: Han Cloud, portraying a gentle mute girl.

On 15 December 2017, it was announced that Ju would depart from SNH48 and continue promotions as a solo artist under Star48. An individual studio and website have been launched to manage her solo career. On 18 December, she released a solo single titled Rain.

2018–present: Solo career and rising popularity
In 2018, Ju starred in the historical drama Legend of Yunxi  alongside Zhang Zhehan. She also sung the theme songs for the drama, "The Fallen Flowers Turn into Mud", and "Sigh of Yunxi".
The series was a commercial hit and received positive reviews for light-hearted and sweet storyline, leading to increased popularity for Ju.
The same year, Ju starred in the romantic comedy drama Mr. Swimmer  alongside Mike Angelo. Ju also became one of the judges for the music variety show The Chinese Youth.

In 2019, Ju starred in the web series adaptation of the Chinese folktale legend Legend of the White Snake alongside Yu Menglong, playing the titular role of Bai Suzhen. She also sung the soundtracks for the drama, including new rendition of classic songs like "Qian Nian Deng Yi Hui" (A Millennium's Wait for a Return), "Du Qing" (Passing Feelings) and "Qing Cheng Shan Xia Bai Suzhen" (Bai Suzhen under Mount Qingcheng). The same year, Ju starred as the female lead in period suspense drama Please Give Me a Pair of Wings  alongside Aaron Yan. Ju was named as one of the most recognizable Chinese actresses in web dramas by the Hong Kong media, and won the Best Actress award at the China Canada Television Festival Award for her performance in Legend of Yunxi. Ju entered the Forbes China Celebrity 100 list for the first time, ranking 94th. Forbes China also listed Ju under their 30 Under 30 Asia 2019 list which consisted of 30 influential people under 30 years old who have had a substantial effect in their fields. In November, Ju released her third EP titled Love Emergency Report.

In 2020, Ju appeared in CCTV New Year's Gala for the first time, acting out a skit Like You Like Me. She starred in the historical romance dramas In a Class of Her Own alongside Song Weilong; and The Blooms at Ruyi Pavilion, which is the unofficial sequel of Legend of Yunxi reuniting with Legend of Yunxi co-star Zhang Zhehan and supporting stars Xu Jiaqi and Wang Youshuo. She ranked 84th on Forbes China Celebrity 100 list.

In 2021, Ju is set to star in the historical romance drama Rebirth for You alongside Joseph Zeng.

Public image
Ju has been referred to as a "once in 4,000 years idol" by Chinese fans since 2014; however, due to a slight mistranslation, she has also been called a "once in 4,000 years beauty" by the Japanese media, causing her to receive increased prominence and criticism.

Discography

Albums

Singles

Soundtracks

Other appearances

Filmography

Film

Television series

Variety show

SNH48 activities

EPs

Albums
 Mae Shika Mukanee (2014)

With Seine River
 Sweet & Bitter (2015)

Units

SNH48 Stage Units

Concert units

Awards and nominations

References

External links
 
 
 

Living people
SNH48 members
Actresses from Sichuan
Singers from Sichuan
21st-century Chinese actresses
Chinese film actresses
Chinese television actresses
Chinese idols
Chinese Mandopop singers
People from Suining
Year of birth missing (living people)